Birkenhead Park Football Club  is an English rugby union team based in Birkenhead, Wirral. The club operates five senior teams, a ladies team (Birkenhead Park Panthers) and six junior sides.  The men's senior team play in North 1 West at the sixth level of the English rugby union system, following their relegation from North Premier at the end of the 2017-18 season.

Club history
Birkenhead Park was formed in 1871, the same year as the Rugby Football Union, from the amalgamation of two smaller clubs, Claughton and Birkenhead Wanderers during the 1871/72 season. After an initial period where the club failed to find any form, the season of 1877/78 saw the team losing only two matches from 19. The club was central to the formation of the Cheshire County Union, and in 1887 Birkenhead Park was chosen as the venue for the Home Nations clash between Wales and Ireland; the first time a Home Nations Championship game had ever been played on neutral soil.

The club has a rich history and have hosted the New Zealand All Blacks team on four occasions most recently in 1978 and in 1984 they hosted the North of England's match against Romania.

The club has won two promotions in the 25 years of club rugby - winning South Lancashire and Cheshire Division One and North 2 West in consecutive seasons in the early 2000s. The first team now plays at the sixth level - North 1 West.

Club honours
Cheshire Cup winners (4): 1878, 1879, 1881, 2008
Euromanx South Lancs/Cheshire 1 champions: 2000–01
North 1 West champions (2): 2001–02, 2014–15
Cheshire Vase winners: 2016
North 1 (east v west) promotion playoff winners: 2016–17

Notable former players

British Lions
 Paul Robert Clauss 1891
 Elliot Nicholson (1899)
 George Edward Hancock (1936 British Lions tour to Argentina)
 Frank Croft Hulme (1904)
 R. B. Maxwell (1924)
 Thomas Knowles (1930)

International players while at Birkenhead Park
 Harry Alexander
 James Baxter
 Paul Robert Clauss
 Wilfrid Lowry
 C. S. Edgar
 Frank Croft Hulme
 P. D. Kendall
 J. C. Marquis 
 B. B. Middleton
 Elliot Nicholson
 John Paterson
 C. Phillips
 J. J. Ravenscroft
 J. Feldman

Other notable players
 Ian Buckett
 Austin Healey
 Richard Downend (a notable cricketer)

References

External links
Birkenhead Park website

 
English rugby union teams
Sport in Birkenhead
Rugby clubs established in 1871
1871 establishments in England